His Wife's Friend is a lost 1919 American silent mystery film directed by Joe De Grasse and written by John Burland Harris-Burland and R. Cecil Smith. The film stars Dorothy Dalton, Warren Cook, Henry Mortimer, Richard Neill, S. Barrett, and William A. Williams. The film was released on December 21, 1919, by Paramount Pictures.

Plot
As described in a film magazine, Lady Marion Grimwood (Dalton) finds little congeniality in her union with Sir Robert Grimwood (Cook) and welcomes the innocent attentions of John Heritage (Mortimer) when he shows an interest in her. The sudden death of her husband by drowning is apparently explained when she receives a note claiming that Sir Robert knew of her attachment to John before his death. While she ponders over this, unwilling to believe in its entirety, she is attacked by Sir Waiverly (Neill), whose attempt to kill her is blocked. It is then discovered that a Chinese man, Ling Foo, possesses a poison that paralyzes will power. This, it is discovered, was the cause of Sir Robert's death. With this last obstacle removed, Lady Marion and John look forward to a life of happiness.

Cast
Dorothy Dalton as Lady Marion Grimwood
Warren Cook as Sir Robert Grimwood
Henry Mortimer as John Heritage
Richard Neill as Lord Waverly (credited as Richard Neil)
S. Barrett as Insp. Marsh
William A. Williams as Dr. Larner (credited as William Williams)
Tom Cameron as Nind 
Paul Cazeneuve as Ling Foo

References

External links 

 

1919 films
American mystery films
Paramount Pictures films
Lost American films
Films about chess
Films directed by Joseph De Grasse
American black-and-white films
American silent feature films
1919 mystery films
1919 lost films
Lost mystery films
1910s English-language films
1910s American films
Silent mystery films